Valery Samsonovich Petrosyan (born 7 March 1942 in Baku) is a Professor, Doctor of Chemical Sciences, academic and member of Presidium of RAEN. From 2008 to 2010 he was a UN expert of chemical security. Deputy chairman of Supreme ecological council of Russia (1990–1996). Foreign Member of Armenian National Academy of Sciences.

Petrosyan was born in 1942 to Armenian parents from Artsakh. He finished the Department of Chemistry of Moscow State University, 1964. Currently he heads the department of physical organic chemistry of the same university. He is a member of International organizations.

External links
Biography

References

1942 births
Living people
Scientists from Baku
Russian people of Armenian descent
Armenian chemists
Moscow State University alumni
Academic staff of Moscow State University